FC Cahul-2005 is a Moldovan football club based in Cahul, Moldova. The club was founded in 1980 as FC Cahul and after they changed their name and reformed in 2005, they now play in the Moldovan "A" Division, the second division in Moldovan football.

History
The club was founded in 1980 as FC Cahul and played in the Moldovan regional championships until independence from the Soviet Union.

They took part in the first championship of the second division obtaining promotion to Divizia Națională. The 1992-1993 championship was the only one played in the top flight, at the end of the season they were relegated again to Divizia A.

In 2005 they changed their name to Cahul-2005 continuing to play championships between the second and third divisions.

League results

Achievements
Divizia B
 Winners (4) : 2006–07, 2012–13, 2014–15, 2016–17

External links
Official website
FC Cahul-2005  at weltfussballarchiv.com

Cahul-2005, FC
Cahul-2005, FC
Cahul, FC
2005 establishments in Moldova
1980 establishments in the Soviet Union
Cahul District
Cahul